Catullus 101 is an elegiac poem written by the Roman poet Gaius Valerius Catullus. It is addressed to Catullus' dead brother or, strictly speaking, to the "mute ashes" which are the only remaining evidence of his brother's body.

Context
The tone is grief-stricken and tender, with Catullus trying to give the best gift he had to bestow (a poem) on his brother, who was taken prematurely. The last words, "Hail and Farewell" (in Latin, ave atque vale), are among Catullus' most famous; an alternative modern translation might be "I salute you...and goodbye".

The meter is elegiac couplet, which was usually employed in love poetry, such as Catullus' addresses to Lesbia. However, the elegiac couplet was originally used by ancient Greek poets to express grief and lamentation, making it an entirely suitable form to express Catullus' mourning.

Text

 The intensive pronoun ipse (ipsum) in this context contrasts the ash to the actual person who existed: Oxford Latin Dictionary, (Oxford: Clarendon Press, 1982, reprinted 1985) p. 965, entry on ipse, meaning 5 ("the actual").

Another elegy
This is one of three poems in which Catullus tries to cope with the loss of his brother. The other poems are Catullus 65 and 68B. The cause of his brother's death is unknown; he apparently died before 57 BC in Bithynia, a northwest region of modern-day Turkey, near the ancient city of Troy.

Modern translations
In addition to its inclusion among the many translations of Catullus' collected poems, Catullus 101 is featured in Nox (2010), a book by Canadian poet and classicist Anne Carson that comes in an accordion format within a box. Nox concerns the death of Carson's own brother, to which the poem of Catullus offers a parallel. Carson provides the Latin text of 101, word-by-word annotations, and "a close and almost awkward translation".

The poem was also adapted in 1803 by the Italian poet Ugo Foscolo as the sonnet "In morte del fratello Giovanni", ("Un dì, s'io non andrò sempre fuggendo/di gente in gente...") which commemorates the death of the poet's brother, Giovanni Foscolo.

Aubrey Beardsley made a translation of the poem, with an accompanying drawing, which he published in volume 8 of the Savoy (November 1896)

It was also used as a shadowhunters farewell in The Shadowhunter Chronicles by Cassandra Clare.

Musical settings
This poem, as translated by Aubrey Beardsley, was set by the composer Ned Rorem under the title "Catullus: On the Burial of his Brother". The Austrian music group Dargaard have performed this poem in song on their album Rise and Fall, naming it "Ave Atque Vale". Composer Frank Brickle set it for voice and two guitars in tribute to his mentor, Milton Babbitt. The Norwegian band Tristania used "ut te postremo donarem mortis" in the choir of the song "Angina" from the album Beyond the Veil (1999); the band is famous for using the Latin choirs in their songs.

References

Bibliography

External links
 
 Poem 101 at Perseus, ed. E. T. Merrill

C101
Poems about death
Laments
Works about brothers
Articles containing video clips